Wedelia is a genus of flowering plants in the family Asteraceae. They are one of the genera commonly called "creeping-oxeyes".

The genus is named in honor of German botanist and physician Georg Wolfgang Wedel, 1645–1721.

Taxonomy
There are difficulties regarding the classification of this genus for its affinities are uncertain. Further studies are needed to clarify its taxonomic and phylogenetic relationships.

Many species were once considered part of Wedelia but have been now transferred to other genera, including Angelphytum, Aspilia, Baltimora, Blainvillea, Chrysogonum, Eclipta, Elaphandra, Eleutheranthera, Guizotia, Heliopsis, Kingianthus, Lasianthaea, Melampodium, Melanthera, Moonia, Sphagneticola, Synedrella, Tuberculocarpus, Verbesina, Viguiera, Villanova, Wollastonia and Zexmenia.

Species list
Species accepted by the Plants of the World Online as of December 2022:

References

External links
 USDA PLANTS Profile
 
 

 
Asteraceae genera
Taxonomy articles created by Polbot